Telefonplan metro station ("Telephone Square") is an outdoor station on Line 14 in the Stockholm metro. The station is located in the borough of Hägersten. It was opened on 5 April 1964 as part of the first stretch of Metro 2, between T-Centralen and Fruängen.

Unlike most of the stations lying nearby, namely among others Midsommarkransen and Hägerstensåsen, the station's name does not refer to any specific area or a specific suburb. Instead, the station's name refers to a small square situated just west of the station's main entrance.

The subway station initially mainly served the Ericsson headquarters, Ericsson's main factory and the nearby serviced apartments of its workers. Ericsson's headquarters moved to Kista in 2003. Nowadays, the facilities of the factory have been taken over by the Swedish University College of Arts, and there are plans to build a design center close to the station. The area immediately east of the station is partially a construction site for new residential buildings, and plans to reconstruct the underground station as well as the whole area of Telefonplan are well developed. There were plans to build two skyscrapers named Tellus Towers, which would have had an entrance from the metro station. This plan is being reevaluated as of 2020. 

Indie music club Landet is situated a few hundred meters from the station, making the station and the area more crowded at nighttime than ever before.

The station also serves the inhabitants of Västberga, and buses to closely situated to Solberga and Älvsjö start from here.

References

Red line (Stockholm metro) stations
Railway stations opened in 1964